SMS Ostfriesland was the second vessel of the  of dreadnought battleships of the Imperial German Navy. Named for the region of East Frisia, Ostfrieslands keel was laid in October 1908 at the Kaiserliche Werft dockyard in Wilhelmshaven. She was launched on 30 September 1909 and was commissioned into the fleet on 1 August 1911. Ostfriesland was assigned to the I Battle Squadron of the High Seas Fleet for the majority of her career, including World War I.

This included the Battle of Jutland on 31 May – 1 June 1916, the largest naval battle of the war. The ship also saw action in the Baltic Sea against the Russian Navy. She was present during the unsuccessful first incursion into the Gulf of Riga in August 1915.

After the German collapse in November 1918, most of the High Seas Fleet was interned in Scapa Flow during the peace negotiations. The four Helgoland-class ships were allowed to remain in Germany, however, and were therefore spared the destruction of the fleet in Scapa Flow. Ostfriesland and her sisters were eventually ceded to the victorious Allied powers as war reparations; Ostfriesland was transferred to the United States Navy. She was sunk during air power trials off the Virginia Capes in July 1921.

Design 

She was powered by three 4-cylinder triple-expansion steam engines with 15 boilers; each engine drove a four-bladed screw. She had a crew of 42 officers and 1,071 enlisted men.

Ostfriesland was armed with a main battery of twelve  SK L/50 guns in six twin gun turrets, with one turret fore, one aft, and two on each flank of the ship. The ship's secondary battery consisted of fourteen  SK L/45 guns, all of which were mounted in casemates in the side of the upper deck. For defense against torpedo boats, she carried fourteen  SK L/45 guns. After 1914, two of the 8.8 cm guns were removed and replaced by 8.8 cm anti-aircraft guns. Ostfriesland was also armed with six  submerged torpedo tubes; one was in the bow, one in the stern, and two on each broadside.

Her main battery gun turrets were protected by the same thickness of KCA on the sides and faces, as well as the barbettes that supported the turrets.

Service history 
Ostfriesland was ordered by the German Imperial Navy (Kaiserliche Marine) under the provisional name Ersatz Oldenburg, as a replacement for the old coastal defense ship . The contract for the ship was awarded to the Kaiserliche Werft (Imperial Dockyard) in Wilhelmshaven under construction number 31. Work began on 19 October 1908 with the laying of her keel, and the ship was launched less than a year later, on 30 September 1909. She was christened by the Princess of Innhausen and Knyphausen, a representative of the oldest East Frisian nobility. Fitting-out, including completion of the superstructure and the installation of armament, lasted until August 1911. Ostfriesland, named for the north-western coastal area of Germany, was commissioned into the High Seas Fleet on 1 August 1911, just under three years from when work commenced.

After commissioning, Ostfriesland conducted sea trials, which were completed by 15 September. Kapitän zur See (KzS) Walter Engelhardt served as the ship's first commanding officer. On the 22nd, the ship was formally assigned to I Battle Squadron of the High Seas Fleet. She then conducted individual ship training exercises, which were followed by I Squadron, and then fleet maneuvers in November. Ostfriesland became the new squadron flagship on 24 April 1912, replacing . The annual summer cruise in July–August, which typically went to Norway, was interrupted by the Agadir Crisis. As a result, the cruise only went into the Baltic. Ostfriesland and the rest of the fleet then fell into a pattern of individual ship, squadron, and full fleet exercises over the next two years of peacetime. Ostfriesland won the 1912/1913 Kaiserschiesspreis—the Kaiser's artillery shooting prize—for I Squadron. Kapitänleutnant Friedrich Beesel was the ship's gunnery officer at the time and, as such, was responsible for the accuracy of the ship's shooting.

On 14 July 1914, the annual summer cruise to Norway began. During the last peacetime cruise of the Imperial Navy, the fleet conducted drills off Skagen before proceeding to the Norwegian fjords on 25 July. The following day the fleet began to steam back to Germany, as a result of Austria-Hungary's ultimatum to Serbia. On the 27th, the entire fleet assembled off Cape Skadenes before returning to port, where it remained at a heightened state of readiness. War between Austria-Hungary and Serbia broke out on the 28th, and in the span of a week all of the major European powers had joined the conflict. By 29 July Ostfriesland and the rest of I Squadron was back in Wilhelmshaven.

World War I 
The first major naval action in the North Sea, the Battle of Helgoland Bight, took place on 28 August 1914. At 04:30, Helgoland, which was stationed off the heavily fortified island of Wangerooge, received the order to join Ostfriesland and sail out of the harbor. By 07:30, the ships had returned to port for the night. On the afternoon of 7 September, Ostfriesland and the rest of the High Seas Fleet conducted a training cruise to the island of Heligoland. In October, Ostfriesland was equipped with a pair of 8.8 cm flak guns for anti-air defense.

Ostfriesland was present during the first sortie by the German fleet into the North Sea, which took place on 2–3 November 1914. No British forces were encountered during the operation. A second operation followed on 15–16 December. This sortie was the initiation of a strategy adopted by Admiral Friedrich von Ingenohl, the commander of the High Seas Fleet. Admiral Ingenohl intended to use the battlecruisers of Konteradmiral (Rear Admiral) Franz von Hipper's I Scouting Group to raid British coastal towns to lure out portions of the Grand Fleet where they could be destroyed by the High Seas Fleet. Early on 15 December the fleet left port to raid the towns of Scarborough, Hartlepool, and Whitby. That evening, the German battle fleet of some twelve dreadnoughts—including Ostfriesland and her three sisters—and eight pre-dreadnoughts came to within  of an isolated squadron of six British battleships. However, skirmishes between the rival destroyer screens in the darkness convinced Ingenohl that he was faced with the entire Grand Fleet. Under orders from Kaiser Wilhelm II to avoid risking the fleet unnecessarily, Ingenohl broke off the engagement and turned the battle fleet back toward Germany.

The Battle of Dogger Bank, in which Vice Admiral David Beatty's 1st and 2nd Battlecruiser Squadrons ambushed the battlecruisers of I Scouting Group, occurred on 24 January 1915. Ostfriesland and the rest of I Squadron sortied to reinforce the outnumbered German battlecruisers; I Squadron left port at 12:33 CET, along with the pre-dreadnoughts of II Squadron. They were too late, however, and failed to locate any British forces. By 19:05, the fleet had returned to the Schillig Roads outside Wilhelmshaven. In the meantime, the armored cruiser  had been overwhelmed by concentrated British fire and sunk, while the battlecruiser  was severely damaged by a fire in one of the ammunition magazines. As a result, Kaiser Wilhelm II removed Ingenohl from his post and replaced him with Admiral Hugo von Pohl on 2 February.

The eight I Squadron ships went into the Baltic on 22 February 1915 for unit training, which lasted until 13 March. Following their return to the North Sea, the ships participated in a series of uneventful fleet sorties on 29–30 March, 17–18 April, 21–22 April, 17–18 May, and 29–30 May. Ostfriesland and the rest of the fleet remained in port until 4 August, when I Squadron returned to the Baltic for another round of training maneuvers. That month, KzS Ernst-Oldwig von Natzmer replaced Engelhardt as the ship's commanding officer. From the Baltic, the squadron was attached to the naval force that attempted to sweep the Gulf of Riga of Russian naval forces in August 1915. The plan called for channels in Russian minefields to be swept so that the Russian naval presence, which included the pre-dreadnought battleship , could be eliminated. The Germans would then lay minefields of their own to prevent Russian ships from returning to the Gulf. Ostfriesland and the majority of the other big ships of the High Seas Fleet remained outside the Gulf for the entirety of the operation. After three days, the Russian minefields had been cleared, and the flotilla entered the Gulf on 19 August, but reports of Allied submarines in the area prompted a German withdrawal from the Gulf the following day. By 26 August, I Squadron had returned to Wilhelmshaven.

On 23–24 October, the High Seas Fleet undertook its last major offensive operation under the command of Admiral Pohl, though it ended without contact with British forces. By January 1916 hepatic cancer had weakened Pohl to the point where he was no longer able to carry out his duties, and he was replaced by Vizeadmiral (Vice Admiral) Reinhard Scheer in January. Scheer proposed a more aggressive policy designed to force a confrontation with the British Grand Fleet; he received approval from the Kaiser in February. Scheer's first operation was a sweep into the North Sea on 5–7 March, followed by two more on 21–22 March and 25–26 March. During Scheer's next operation, Ostfriesland supported a raid on the English coast on 24 April 1916 conducted by the German battlecruiser force. The battlecruisers left the Jade Estuary at 10:55 and the rest of the High Seas Fleet followed at 13:40. The battlecruiser Seydlitz struck a mine while en route to the target, and had to withdraw. The other battlecruisers bombarded the town of Lowestoft unopposed but, during the approach to Yarmouth, encountered the British cruisers of the Harwich Force. A short gun duel ensued before the Harwich Force withdrew. Reports of British submarines in the area prompted I Scouting Group to retreat. At this point, Scheer, who had been warned of the sortie of the Grand Fleet from its base in Scapa Flow, also withdrew to safer German waters.

Battle of Jutland 

Ostfriesland was present during the fleet operation that resulted in the battle of Jutland, which took place on 31 May and 1 June 1916. The German fleet again sought to draw out and isolate a portion of the Grand Fleet and destroy it before the main British fleet could retaliate. During the operation, Ostfriesland was the lead ship in I Squadron's I Division and the ninth ship in the line, directly astern of the fleet flagship  and ahead of her sister Thüringen. I Squadron was the center of the German line, behind the eight König- and Kaiser-class battleships of III Squadron. The six elderly pre-dreadnoughts of III and IV Divisions—II Battle Squadron—formed the rear of the formation. Ostfriesland flew the flag of Vizeadmiral (Vice Admiral) Erhardt Schmidt, the squadron commander during the battle and Scheer's deputy commander.

Shortly before 16:00, the battlecruisers of I Scouting Group encountered the British 1st Battlecruiser Squadron under the command of David Beatty. By this time, the German battlecruisers were steaming south to draw the British ships toward the main body of the High Seas Fleet. At 17:30, the crew of the leading German battleship, König, spotted both I Scouting Group and the 1st Battlecruiser Squadron approaching. The German battlecruisers were steaming to starboard, while the British ships steamed to port. At 17:45, Scheer ordered a two-point turn to port to bring his ships closer to the British battlecruisers and, a minute later, the order to open fire was given.

While the leading battleships engaged the British battlecruiser squadron, Ostfriesland and ten other battleships fired on the British 2nd Light Cruiser Squadron. Ostfriesland, and Nassau engaged the cruiser , though only Nassau scored a hit. Ostfriesland claimed hits from her third and fourth salvos. Warspite was hit by a total of thirteen heavy shells during this period.

By 20:15, the German battle line had faced the entire deployed Grand Fleet a second time. Scheer ordered a 180-degree turn at 20:17, which was covered by a charge by the battlecruiser squadron and a torpedo-boat attack. In order to hasten the maneuver, Schmidt ordered Ostfriesland to turn immediately without waiting for Thüringen behind him. This move caused some difficulty for the III Squadron ships ahead, though the ships quickly returned to their stations. At around 23:30, the German fleet reorganized into the night cruising formation. Ostfriesland was the eighth ship, stationed toward the front of the 24-ship line. An hour later, the leading units of the German line encountered British light forces and a violent firefight at close range ensued. Sometime around 01:10, the armored cruiser  stumbled into the German line. Thüringen illuminated the vessel with her spotlights and poured salvos of 30.5 cm rounds into the ship. Ostfriesland fired with her 15 cm guns and Kaiser fired both 30.5 cm and 15 cm guns. In the span of less than a minute, two massive explosions tore the cruiser apart and killed the entire 857-man crew.

Despite the ferocity of the night fighting, the High Seas Fleet punched through the British destroyer forces and reached Horns Reef by 4:00 on 1 June. At 06:20, however, Ostfriesland struck a mine, previously laid by the destroyer  on 4 May, on her starboard side. The ship hauled out of line, as the explosion was initially thought to have been a torpedo fired by a submarine. Her anti-submarine escort was eventually reinforced by a floatplane, which spotted what it believed to be a British submarine at 12:20. Ostfriesland turned away, which caused the torpedo bulkhead, damaged slightly by the mine explosion, to tear open. More water entered the ship and caused a 4.75 degree list to starboard, forcing Ostfriesland to reduce speed again. The ship requested assistance from a pumping ship at 14:20, but by 14:45 the flooding was under control and the ship passed the Outer Jade Lightship. The mine tore a hole that measured  and allowed  of water into the ship. Further flooding occurred after the torpedo bulkhead damage at 12:20, though the full damage report has not survived. Ostfriesland was drydocked in Wilhelmshaven for repairs, which lasted until 26 July. In the course of the battle, Ostfriesland fired 111 rounds from her main battery, 101 shells from her 15 cm guns, and a single 8.8 cm shell. The only damage sustained was the mine that was struck on the morning of 1 June, which killed one man and wounded ten.

Later operations 
On 18 August 1916, Scheer attempted a repeat of the 31 May operation. The two serviceable German battlecruisers, Moltke and Von der Tann, supported by three dreadnoughts, were to bombard the coastal town of Sunderland in an attempt to draw out and destroy Beatty's battlecruisers. The rest of the fleet, including Ostfriesland, would trail behind and provide cover. On the approach to the English coast during the action of 19 August 1916, Scheer turned north after receiving a false report from a zeppelin about a British unit in the area. As a result, the bombardment was not carried out, and by 14:35, Scheer had been warned of the Grand Fleet's approach and so turned his forces around and retreated to German ports.

On 25–26 September, Ostfriesland and the rest of I Squadron provided support for a sweep out to the Terschelling Bank conducted by the II Führer der Torpedoboote (Leader of Torpedo Boats). Scheer conducted another fleet operation on 18–20 October in the direction of the Dogger Bank. For the majority of 1917, Ostfriesland was assigned to guard duty in the German Bight. During Operation Albion, the amphibious assault on the Russian-held islands in the Gulf of Riga, Ostfriesland and her three sisters were moved to the Danish straits to block any possible British attempt to intervene. On 28 October the four ships arrived in Putzig Wiek, and from there steamed to Arensburg on the 29th. On 2 November the operation was completed and Ostfriesland and her sisters began the voyage back to the North Sea. In March 1918, Natzmer was replaced as the ship's commander by KzS Hans Herr. A final abortive fleet sortie took place on 23–24 April 1918. Ostfriesland, Thüringen, and Nassau were formed into a special unit for Operation Schlußstein, a planned occupation of St. Petersburg. The three ships reached the Baltic on 10 August, but the operation was postponed and eventually canceled. The special unit was dissolved on 21 August and the battleships were back in Wilhelmshaven on the 23rd.

The end of the war 
Ostfriesland and her three sisters were to have taken part in a final fleet action at the end of October 1918, just over 2 weeks before the Armistice was signed. The bulk of the High Seas Fleet was to have sortied from its base in Wilhelmshaven to engage the British Grand Fleet; Scheer—by now the Großadmiral (Grand Admiral) of the fleet—intended to inflict as much damage as possible on the British navy, to improve Germany's bargaining position, despite the expected casualties. But many of the war-weary sailors felt that the operation would disrupt the peace process and prolong the war. On the morning of 29 October 1918, the order was given to sail from Wilhelmshaven the following day. Starting on the night of the 29th, sailors on Thüringen and then on several other battleships mutinied. The unrest ultimately forced Hipper and Scheer to cancel the operation. Informed of the situation, the Kaiser stated "I no longer have a navy". On 16 December, Ostfriesland was decommissioned and used as a barracks ship.

Following the capitulation of Germany in November 1918, most of the High Seas Fleet, under the command of Rear Admiral Ludwig von Reuter, was interned in the British naval base in Scapa Flow. Only the most modern ships were sent for internment; the four Helgoland-class ships were left in Germany. On the morning of 21 June, the British fleet left Scapa Flow to conduct training maneuvers, and at 11:20 Reuter transmitted the order to scuttle his ships. In the span of a few hours, ten battleships and five battlecruisers sank in the shallow waters of Scapa Flow. KzS Karl Windmüller served as Ostfrieslands final commander, until she was stricken from the navy list on 5 November 1919. She was then surrendered to the Allies as "H" as a replacement for the ships that had been scuttled. The ship remained in Germany until 7 April 1920, when a German crew took her to Rosyth. She was ceded to the United States as war reparations, commissioned on 7 April at Rosyth as USS Ostfriesland and commanded by Captain J. F. Hellweg. On 9 April an American crew arrived to bring her to the US. Even though she needed repairs, Ostfriesland was able to sail to New York. She was later decommissioned there on 20 September 1920.

US bombing target
In July 1921, the Army Air Service and the US Navy conducted a series of bombing tests off Cape Henry, led by General Billy Mitchell. The targets included demobilized American and former German warships, including the old battleship , the cruiser , and finally Ostfriesland on 20 July. At 13:30 ET, the first attack wave, armed with  bombs, struck the stationary ship. Eight of thirty-three bombs found their mark, after which the ship was inspected. The second wave was also armed with 230 lb bombs, and the third and fourth carried  bombs. Five 600 lb bombs found their mark, but little damage was done to the ship's topside. The bombs that nearly missed the ship, however, had done significant underwater damage to the hull, which allowed some flooding and created a list of five degrees to port and three additional feet of draft at the stern. The bombing schedule was interrupted by a storm in the late afternoon.

Early on the morning of 21 July, the fifth wave of bombers began their attack. At 08:52, the first Army bomber dropped a  bomb that hit the ship; four more bombers followed and scored two further hits. Inspectors again went aboard Ostfriesland following the fifth attack and noted that the hits had not seriously damaged the ship, though one had created a large hole on her starboard side that allowed further flooding. By noon, she was down five feet at the stern and one foot at the bow. At 12:19, the next attack wave, equipped with  bombs, struck. Six bombs were dropped, none of which hit, though three detonated very close to the hull. At 12:30, Ostfriesland began to sink rapidly by the stern and the list to port increased dramatically. At 12:40, the ship rolled over and sank. The results of the tests were widely publicized and Mitchell became both a national hero and the "infallible prophet of aviation".

The leadership of the US Navy, however, was outraged by Mitchell's handling of the tests; the 2,000 lb bombs had not been sanctioned by the Navy, which had set the rules for the engagement. Mitchell's bombers had also not allowed inspectors aboard the ship between bombing runs as stipulated by the Navy. The joint Army–Navy report on the tests, issued a month later and signed by General John Pershing, stated that "the battleship is still the backbone of the fleet." Mitchell wrote his own, contradictory account of the tests, which was then leaked to the press. The sinking of the battleship sparked great controversy in the American public sphere; Mitchell's supporters exaggerated the significance of the tests by falsely claiming Ostfriesland to be an unsinkable "super-battleship" and that "old sea dogs ... wept aloud." Senator William Borah argued that the tests had rendered battleships obsolete. Mitchell was widely supported in the press, though his increasingly combative tactics eventually resulted in a court-martial for insubordination that forced him to retire from the military.

Notes

Footnotes

Citations

References

Further reading
 

1909 ships
Battleships sunk by aircraft as targets
Helgoland-class battleships
Ships built in Kiel
Shipwrecks of the Virginia coast
World War I battleships of Germany
Ships sunk by US aircraft
Maritime incidents in 1921